Ville Koivunen (born 13 June 2003) is a Finnish professional ice hockey winger for Oulun Kärpät of the Finnish Liiga as a prospect for the Carolina Hurricanes of the National Hockey League (NHL).

Playing career
During the 2020–21 season, he served as an alternate captain and recorded 23 goals and 26 assists in 38 games with Karpat's junior team in Finland's top junior league, U20 SM-sarja. He was subsequently named the league's Rookie of the Year and selected to the Second All-Star Team after he ranked third in the league in goals and points. He made his professional debut for Kärpät during the 2021–22 season.

Koivunen was drafted in the second round, 51st overall, by the Carolina Hurricanes in the 2021 NHL Entry Draft. On 15 August 2021, the Hurricanes signed Koivunen to a three-year, entry-level contract.

International play

Koivunen represented Finland at the 2021 IIHF World U18 Championships where he recorded four goals and six assists in seven games. He represented Finland at the 2022 World Junior Ice Hockey Championships and won a silver medal.

Career statistics

Regular season and playoffs

International

References

External links
 

2003 births
Living people
Finnish ice hockey players
Carolina Hurricanes draft picks
Oulun Kärpät players
Sportspeople from Oulu